František Kopečný (4 October 1909 in Určice – 27 March 1990 in Vrahovice) was Czechoslovak bohemist and slavist. He was interested in etymology and dialectology.

He studied Czech and German languages at the Masaryk University. He then worked at the Palacký University. With colleagues, he wrote an Old Slavic dictionary. From 1952, he worked at Czechoslovak Academy of Sciences, where he wrote an Etymological dictionary.

References

Linguists
Etymologists
Academic staff of Palacký University Olomouc
Slavists
1909 births
1990 deaths
People from Prostějov District
Masaryk University alumni